Yinon Magal (born 27 April 1969) is an Israeli journalist and politician. He served as a member of the Knesset for the Jewish Home for most of 2015.

Biography
Yinon Elisha Magal was born and raised in Bat Yam. During his IDF national service, he was a member of the Sayeret Matkal special forces, and was involved in the abduction of Abdel Karim Obeid. After leaving the army, he joined Kol Yisrael. He later moved to Army Radio, where he reported on Israeli settlements. before joining Hadashot 10, where he was a reporter on military affairs. He studied Islam, Middle Eastern studies and Jewish thought at the Hebrew University of Jerusalem, gaining a Bachelor's degree. He later worked as an anchor on Channel 1, presenting the Mabat LaHadashot news show. In 2012, he joined the Walla! news website, where he became editor.

In December 2014, he announced he was leaving Walla! to enter politics. He joined the Jewish Home party, and was placed sixth on its list for the 2015 elections. He was elected to the Knesset as the party won eight seats. However, in November 2015, Magal announced his resignation from the Knesset following sexual harassment allegations. In January 2016 the police investigation into him was closed.

In 2020 Magal appeared on The Singer in the Mask as "Cactus". He was the second contestant eliminated.

In 2005 he married Gitit, an interior designer. They are the parents of four sons and lived in Tel Aviv. In March 2022 the couple separated.

References

External links

Living people
1969 births
Israeli Jews
Israeli journalists
Hebrew University of Jerusalem alumni
Channel 1 (Israel) people
The Jewish Home politicians
Members of the 20th Knesset (2015–2019)
People from Bat Yam